The Free Fire World Series (FFWS) is the biannual professional Garena Free Fire world championship tournament hosted by Garena. The 2021 edition of the event became world's most watched esports event by peak live viewer count.

Overview 
The Free Fire World Series uses the Squad Battle Royale mode available in the video game Free Fire. 52 players (13 teams each one having four players) airdrop onto an island without any weapons or armor. Once on the ground, players must search for weapons, armor, and med kits. Players can knock down players using the weapons they collected. The last team to survive wins the game. Players get points based on the number of eliminations and survival time.

History 
Free Fire World Series 2019 was held in November 2019 at Barra Olympic Park, Rio de Janeiro, and featured a prize pool of $400,000. 12 teams from Brazil, Thailand, Indonesia, Vietnam, the Middle East, India, Latin America, North America, and Eurasia participated in the championship. It was won by the Brazilian representatives the Corinthians. The event had a peak live viewer count of 1.9 million.

Due to the Coronavirus pandemic, Free Fire World Series 2020 had to be replaced with Free Fire Continental series which was held to be on April 19. Free Fire Continental Series was held as 3 separate events for Asia, EMEA and Americas. The event was streamed live on YouTube and had 1.5 million peak live viewers. There was a prize pool of $300,000. In each region a total of 18 teams fought for a prize pool of $300,000. The Asian region winner was EXP Esports, the EMEA region winner was Sbornaya Chr, and the American region winner was Team Liquid.

In 2021, Garena announced the Free Fire World Series with a prize pool of $2million. The event was held in May 2021 at Marina Bay Sands, Singapore. A total of 18 teams competes for the FFWS trophy, which was won by Phoenix Force (EVOS Esports TH). The Free Fire World Series 2021 became the most watched esports event in history with over 5.4million peak live viewers, surpassing the 2021 League of Legends World Championship, which had 4 million peak viewers.

FFWS 2022 was held in May 2022 at the Resort World Sentosa convention centre. The event featured 18 teams representing different regions, competing for a prize pool of $2million. The championship was won by Attack All Around. The event had a maximum of 1.4million concurrent viewers during the grand finale, which was a decrease of 4million viewers from the 2021 viewership, partially due to the ban of Free Fire in India.

The second FFWS event of 2022 was held in Bangkok, Thailand. The event featured 17 teams from around the world. Players compete for a prize pool of $2 million. The championship was won by EVOS Phoneix which won the second place in the first FFWS event in 2022.

Results

References 

Esports tournaments
World championships in esports